Hedvig Valborg "Valma" Florström (5 December 1878 – 18 December 1956) was a Finnish diver, who won five national championships.

She performed a diving exhibition with Ebba Gisico of Sweden at the 1908 Summer Olympics, which was the first appearance of women in Olympic aquatics. This also made her the first woman in a Finnish Olympic team.

She won the Finnish national championship gold in women's platform diving in 1906, 1907, 1908, 1909, 1910 and 1911.

She represented the club Helsingfors Simsällskap, where she was a board member in 1910–1912, and a swimming teacher in 1901–1912.

Sources

References 

1878 births
1956 deaths
Finnish female divers
Divers at the 1908 Summer Olympics
Olympic divers of Finland